Tropical Storm Barijat, known in the Philippines as Tropical Storm Neneng, was a weak tropical storm that caused flooding in the far northern regions of the Philippines and Southern China. The thirty-third tropical depression and twenty-third tropical storm of the 2018 Pacific typhoon season, it was first noted as an area of convection in the South China Sea on September 6. On September 8, it was upgraded to a tropical depression, and by September 11, it intensified into a tropical storm, with the Japan Meteorological Agency (JMA) giving it the name Barijat. Barijat continued westward, and on November 12 at 00:30 UTC, it made landfall over Zhanjiang, quickly dissipating afterwards.

Meteorological history

The next day at 20:00 UTC, its development potential was upgraded to medium as it continued northeastward, with satellite imagery depicting a partially exposed low-level circulation. The system continued northeastwards, and on September 8 at 06:00 UTC, both the JMA and the PAGASA assessed that the system had developed into a tropical depression, with the PAGASA assigning it the local name Neneng as the system was located inside the agency's area of responsibility. Later that day at 19:30 UTC, the JTWC issued a Tropical Cyclone Formation Alert for the system, and on September 9 at 06:00 UTC, the JTWC upgraded the system to a tropical depression, giving it the designation 27W, after which the system abruptly turned westward over the Bashi Channel. Infrared satellite imagery at 21:00 UTC showed a partially-exposed circulation center with deep convection over the southern portion of the storm.

Barijat continued westward under marginally favorable conditions, before weakening slightly the next day. Enhanced infrared satellite imagery showed that Barijat's circulation became partially exposed, and on September 12 at 00:30 UTC, Barijat made landfall over Zhanjiang, with satellite imagery showing weak convection being sheared, completely exposing the circulation center. On the next day at 06:00 UTC, both the JMA and the JTWC downgraded Barijat to a tropical depression, with the JTWC downgrading Barijat to a tropical disturbance and the JMA assessing Barijat to have dissipated 6 hours later.

Preparations and impact

Philippines
Barijat's precursor brought rains over northern Luzon, enhancing the southwest monsoon in the process. It also brought gusty winds and heavy rains to the province of Batanes and to the Babuyan Islands, with the PAGASA raising Tropical Cyclone Wind Signal No. #1 over Batanes. The PAGASA advised residents living in the affected areas to take precautions against flooding and landslides, with fishermen and other people with small vessels being advised against sailing in the area. Barijat caused several landslides in Batanes, with floods entering schools and creeks overflowing. Barijat brought increased risk of flooding and landslides in the provinces of Batanes, Cagayan, and Isabela, with the soil saturation worsening the effects of Typhoon Mangkhut.

China
The weather bureau of Hainan issued an alert against strong gales and downpours. 40 thousand residents were evacuated in the cities of Zhanjiang and Maoming, with passenger and train services being halted due to safety concerns. 11 thousand fishermen, 32 thousand offshore workers, and 36 thousand boats were brought back to land. In Macau, there was no significant disruption to the city's activities. Damages in China were estimated at ¥50 million (US$7.3 million).

Vietnam
The northern parts of Vietnam were warned of possible flash flooding.

See also

Weather of 2018
Tropical cyclones in 2018

References

External links

27W.BARIJAT from the U.S. Naval Research Laboratory
 General Information of Tropical Storm Barijat (1823) from Digital Typhoon
 JMA Best Track Data of Tropical Storm Barijat (1823) (in Japanese)
 JMA Best Track (Graphics) of Tropical Storm Barijat (1823)

Tropical cyclones in 2018
2018 Pacific typhoon season